Australia competed at the 2011 World Championships in Athletics from 27 August to 4 September in Daegu, South Korea.

Team selection

An initial Australian Flame team of 24 has been announced by Athletics Australia, with reigning World champions Steve Hooker and Dani Samuels set to lead the green and gold charge at the competition.  Athletes looking to qualify but not yet announced are eligible for selection until 31 July 2011 (excluding marathon and walks). A final team of 47 athletes was announced on 2 August 2011.

The following athletes appeared on the preliminary Entry List, but not on the Official Start List of the specific event,
resulting in a total number of 41 competitors:

 
In addition, the team includes 2 athletes invited by the IPC for exhibition events: Richard Colman, 400m T53 (wheelchair) men, and Madison de Rozario, 800m T54 (wheelchair) women.

Medalists
The following Australian competitors won medals at the Championships

Results

Men

Women

Two years after finishing only 5th although being the top favourite at the 12th IAAF World Championships in Berlin, Sally Pearson won the gold medal in the 100 m hurdles event with the world's fourth fastest time of 12.28s, a new Oceania Area record.

References

External links
Official local organising committee website
Official IAAF competition website

Nations at the 2011 World Championships in Athletics
World Championships in Athletics
2011